Joshua Villalobos is a soccer player who plays midfielder for the Puerto Rican national team.  He played college soccer at Furman University where he was a standout.

References

1985 births
Living people
American soccer players
Puerto Rican footballers
Puerto Rico international footballers
Furman Paladins men's soccer players
North Carolina Fusion U23 players
Soccer players from North Carolina
USL League Two players
United States men's youth international soccer players
Association football midfielders